The Gawri Wall (Persian: دیوار گَوری) was a defensive fortification built and in use between the 4th and 6th centuries during the rule of the Sasanians and Parthians.

2019 archaeological discovery 

Though the site was known to the local population living in its vicinity, it was unknown to the archaeological community until its discovery was published in the journal Antiquity in August 2019. Locals have long referred to the fortification as the Gawri Wall.

See also 
 Great Wall of Gorgan
 Wall of Tammisha
 Khurasan Wall
 Sasanian defense lines

References 

Border barriers
Fortification lines
Walls
2nd-century fortifications
Sasanian defense lines
Military history of the Sasanian Empire
Gawri
Walls in Iran
Military history of the Parthian Empire
Fortifications in Iran